Lynley Joy Pedruco (née Lucas) (born 11 October 1960) is a former New Zealand association football player who represented her country.

Pedruco made her Football Ferns debut in a 3–0 win over Switzerland on 8 December 1984 and ended her international career with 19 caps to her credit.

Pedruco represented New Zealand at the Women's World Cup finals in China in 1991 playing 2 group games; a 0–4 loss to Norway and a 1–4 loss to China.

References

External links

1960 births
Living people
New Zealand women's international footballers
New Zealand women's association footballers
1991 FIFA Women's World Cup players
Women's association football defenders